Glossodoris pantherina is a species of sea slug, a dorid nudibranch, a shell-less marine gastropod mollusk in the family Chromodorididae.

Distribution 
This species was first discovered in Pulu Jedan on the east coast of the Aru Islands, Indonesia.

Description

References

Chromodorididae
Gastropods described in 1905